Joe Bravo may refer to:

 Joe Bravo (wrestler), Puerto Rican wrestler
 Joe Bravo (jockey) (born 1971), American jockey